On Spec is a digest-sized, perfect-bound, Canadian quarterly magazine publishing stories and poetry in science fiction, fantasy, and allied genres broadly grouped under the "speculative fiction" umbrella.

History and profile
Based in Edmonton, Alberta, On Spec was founded in 1989 by a small group of Edmonton writers who joined together to form The Copper Pig Writers Society. At the time, there was no paying market for English speculative fiction in Canada (though paying markets in French did exist). On Spec is Canada's longest-running, and according to author Robert J. Sawyer, most successful, English-language magazine in the field.

Much more like a traditional small literary magazine than the mass-market-styled American science fiction digests such as Analog and Asimov's, On Spec was founded to address the frustration that English-speaking Canadian SF writers faced having to "Americanize" their stories for the existing US markets.

Awards
 1990, 1991, 1995, 1997, 2012, 2014, 2015, 2018, Aurora Award Best Work in English: Other.
 2020, 2021 Aurora Award Best Related Work.

See also
 Science fiction magazine
 Fantasy fiction magazine
 Horror fiction magazine
 List of Canadian magazines
 Neo-opsis Science Fiction Magazine

References

External links

 On Spec Magazine Official Website
 Alberta Magazine Publishers Association
 On Spec Magazine's Patreon
 Friends of On Spec Facebook group
 On Spec Twitter feed

1989 establishments in Alberta
Magazines established in 1989
Magazines published in Alberta
Mass media in Edmonton
Quarterly magazines published in Canada
Science fiction digests
Science fiction magazines established in the 1980s
Science fiction magazines published in Canada